The Accent Radio Network was a Rhode Island-based radio network with a Christian-conservative political point of view. Accent Radio Network was founded  in the summer of 2000 by James and Patricia Feijo and went on air December 4, 2000. The Accent Radio Network aired programming original to the network as well as syndicated programs including; The Laura Ingraham Show and Monica Crowley.

Programming from Accent Radio Network, which included some Talk radio format programs, was carried by 18 affiliates located across the United States, mostly very small stations located in small markets. These affiliates were especially concentrated in Missouri (three affiliates), Utah (two affiliates), and the Southeastern United States (nine affiliates). ARN programming was available at no charge to affiliates. ARN also provided listeners in extended areas with audio streaming via the World Wide Web, consumer Digital Video Broadcasting satellite, and a Roku channel.

James and Patricia Feijo were hosts of a program on the network called HealthWatch which promotes a "God-centered view of health and healing." In May 2012, a U.S. District Court judge found that the Feijos had violated an injunction against making claims on their radio show and websites for the cancer-curing effects of natural products sold through their business, Daniel Chapter One.  Jerry Hughes, the network's most prominent non-brokered host, died three weeks later on June 1.

Programming
Original programming on ARN included:
 Daniel Chapter One Truthwatch, with Jim and Tricia Feijo
 Straight Talk, with Jerry Hughes
 Home-&-Garden Radio, with Michael Crose
 Conceived in Liberty, with Jerry Hughes
 Sunday Accents

In addition, ARN worked with several other networks that simulcast ARN programming, or ARN simulcasts their programming. Some of those networks include:
IRN/USA Radio Network
Business Talk Radio Network

References

External links
 WWAB/1330 Lakeland

Religious broadcasting in Florida
2000 establishments in Rhode Island
2012 disestablishments in Rhode Island
Defunct radio networks in the United States

Radio stations established in 2000 
Radio stations disestablished in 2012
Defunct radio stations in the United States